Rampaat is a 2019 Marathi language film directed by Ravi Jadhav. The film stars Abinay Berde and Kashmira Pardeshi in the lead roles with Abhijeet Chavan in a supporting role.

Cast 
 Abhinay Berde as Mithun
 Kashmira Pardeshi as Munni
 Abhijeet Chavan as Munni's father
 Kushal Badrike as Photographer
 Priya Arun as Mithun's mother
 Ankush Choudhary as himself (cameo appearance in the song "Aaichaan Ra")
 Amruta Khanvilkar as herself (cameo appearance in the song "Aaichaan Ra")

Soundtrack  
The music was composed by music duo Chinar - Mahesh.
"Rampaat Rap" - A-Jeet, J-Subodh, Jazzy Nanu, Axsboy and Killer Roxx
"Ye Na Ye Na" - Bela Shende and Rohit Raut
"Aaichaan Ra" - Harshavardhan Wavre, Bela
"Devaji Cha Daan" - Saurabh Salunkhe

Reception 
The Times of India gave the film two-and-a-half out of five stars wrote that "It misses the mark in holding your attention completely, but for the filmy lot among you, this one could be entertaining."

References

External links 

2010s Marathi-language films